The La Panza Range is a mountain range in the Central Coast of California region in San Luis Obispo County, east of the small town of Santa Margarita. It is one of the California Coast Ranges and in the Los Padres National Forest.

The range is a northern extension of the Sierra Madre Mountains, a mountain range beginning in the northern part of Santa Barbara County.

References

Columbia Gazetteer of North America

 
California Coast Ranges
Mountain ranges of San Luis Obispo County, California
Los Padres National Forest
Santa Lucia Ranger District, Los Padres National Forest